Leon Griffiths (15 February 1928 – 10 June 1992) was a British writer who worked in television and film. He is best known for being the creator of the ITV comedy-drama Minder, which followed the exploits of a salesman Arthur Daley, played by George Cole and his two minders, Terry McCann (Dennis Waterman) from Series 1 to Series 7 and Ray Daley (Gary Webster) from Series 8 to Series 10. The inspiration for the show came from the stories he heard while frequenting drinking clubs in north London.

Early life and career
Griffiths was born in Sheffield, but grew up in Glasgow. During his national service he worked for the British Forces Network alongside Cliff Michelmore. After completing his national service, he took up a writing post with the Daily Worker, a communist newspaper.

Screenwriter works
He later went on to write for TV shows The Adventures of Robin Hood, The Four Just Men and Play for Today. His film credits include The Grissom Gang, The Hellfire Club, The Squeeze and The Treasure of Monte Cristo.

Death

Griffiths died on 10 June 1992, aged 64. He is buried on the east side of Highgate Cemetery in north London.

References

External links

1928 births
1992 deaths
Burials at Highgate Cemetery
British television writers
20th-century screenwriters